The 1986–87 Algerian Cup is the 25th edition of the Algerian Cup. JE Tizi Ouzou are the defending champions, having beaten WKF Collo 1–0 in the previous season's final.

Round of 64

Round of 32

Round of 16

Quarter-finals

Semi-finals

Final

Match

References

Algerian Cup
Algerian Cup
Algerian Cup